In mathematics, the discrete q-Hermite polynomials  are two closely related families hn(x;q) and ĥn(x;q) of basic hypergeometric orthogonal polynomials in the basic Askey scheme, introduced by .  give a detailed list of their properties. hn(x;q) is also called discrete q-Hermite I polynomials and ĥn(x;q) is also called discrete q-Hermite II polynomials.

Definition

The discrete q-Hermite polynomials are given in terms of basic hypergeometric functions and the Al-Salam–Carlitz polynomials by 

and are related by

References

Orthogonal polynomials
Q-analogs
Special hypergeometric functions